Darwinia terricola, commonly known as the Blackwood bell, is a species of flowering plant in the myrtle family Myrtaceae and is endemic to a small area in the south-west of Western Australia. It is a small, low, sometimes prostrate shrub with small, linear leaves and small groups of flowers surrounded by reddish-green bracts and which usually lie on the ground.

Description
There is a ring of short hairs near the end of the style. Flowering occurs in November and December.

Taxonomy and naming
Darwinia terricola was first formally described in 2012 by Greg Keighery from a specimen collected in the Blackwood State Forest between Margaret River and Nannup. The description was published in the Western Australian Naturalist. The specific epithet (terricola) is derived from the Latin word terra meaning "earth", "ground" or "soil" and the suffix -cola meaning "inhabitant", referring to the prostrate habit of this species and the manner in which the flowers lie on the ground.

Distribution and habitat
Blackwood bell is only known from the Blackwood State Forest in the Jarrah Forest and Warrenbioregions, where it grows in sandy clay in mallee shrubland.

Conservation status
Darwinia terricola is classified as "Threatened Flora (Declared Rare Flora — Extant)" by the Western Australian Government Department of Parks and Wildlife.

References

terricola
Endemic flora of Western Australia
Endangered flora of Australia
Myrtales of Australia
Rosids of Western Australia
Plants described in 2012
Taxa named by Gregory John Keighery